Events in the year 1992 in Eritrea.

Incumbents 

 President: Isaias Afewerki

Events 

 7 April – The government issues a proclamation for a referendum to be held.

Deaths

References 

 
1990s in Eritrea
Years of the 20th century in Eritrea
Eritrea
Eritrea